A Culacula is a paddle war club from Fiji.

Uses in Fiji
Usually cut from a hardwood type of iron wood, it has a broad blade and was used by chiefs or priests to deflect arrows during war.

Bibliography
 Fergus Clunie, Fijian Weapons & Warfare, 2003.
 Jean-Edouard Carlier, Archipels Fidji - Tonga - Samoa: La Polynésie Occidentale, Voyageurs & curieux, 2005.
 Rod Ewins, Fijian Artefacts: The Tasmanian Museum and Art Gallery Collection, Tasmanian Museum and Art Gallery, 1982.

References

See also
 Totokia
 Gata 
 Sali
 Ula
 Bulibuli

 
Throwing clubs
Clubs (weapon)
Primitive weapons
Ritual weapons
Fijian culture